Khayal Ahmad Kastro (born 9 October 1970) is a Pakistani politician who had been a member of the Provincial Assembly of the Punjab from August 2018 till January 2023.

Political career

He was elected to the Provincial Assembly of the Punjab as a candidate of Pakistan Tehreek-e-Insaf from Constituency PP-110 (Faisalabad-XIV in 2018 Pakistani general election.

In December 2020, he was appointed as Provincial Minister of Punjab for Culture and Colonies.

References

Living people
Punjabi people
Pakistan Tehreek-e-Insaf MPAs (Punjab)
1970 births